Chabad, also known as Lubavitch, Habad and Chabad-Lubavitch, is an Orthodox Jewish Hasidic dynasty. Chabad is one of the world's best-known Hasidic movements, particularly for its outreach activities. It is one of the largest Hasidic groups and Jewish religious organizations in the world. Unlike most Haredi groups, which are self-segregating, Chabad operates mainly in the wider world and caters to secularized Jews.

Founded in 1775 by Rabbi Shneur Zalman of Liadi, the name "Chabad" is an acronym formed from three Hebrew words—Chokhmah, Binah, Da'at (the first three sefirot of the kabbalistic Tree of Life): "Wisdom, Understanding, and Knowledge"—which represent the intellectual and kabbalistic underpinnings of the movement. The name Lubavitch derives from the town in which the now-dominant line of leaders resided from 1813 to 1915. Other, non-Lubavitch scions of Chabad either disappeared or merged into the Lubavitch line. In the 1930s, the sixth Rebbe of Chabad, Rabbi Yosef Yitzchak Schneersohn, moved the center of the Chabad movement from Russia to Poland. After the outbreak of World War II, he moved the center of the movement to the United States.

In 1951, Rabbi Menachem Mendel Schneerson formally accepted the leadership as the seventh Chabad Rebbe. He transformed the movement into one of the most widespread Jewish movements in the world today. Under his leadership, Chabad established a large network of institutions that seek to satisfy religious, social and humanitarian needs across the world. Chabad institutions provide outreach to unaffiliated Jews and humanitarian aid, as well as religious, cultural and educational activities. Prior to his death in 1994, Schneerson was believed by some of his followers to be the Messiah, with his own position on the matter debated among scholars. Messianic ideology in Chabad sparked controversy in various Jewish communities and is still an unresolved matter. Following his death, no successor was appointed as a new central leader.

In 2018, Marcin Wodziński estimated that the Chabad movement accounted for 13% of the global Hasidic population. The total number of Chabad households is estimated to be between 16,000 and 17,000. The number of those who sporadically or regularly attend Chabad events is far larger; in 2005 the Jerusalem Center for Public Affairs reported that up to one million Jews attend Chabad services at least once a year. In a 2020 study, the Pew Research Center found that 16% of American Jews attend Chabad services regularly or semi-regularly.

History 
The Chabad movement was established after the First Partition of Poland in the town of Liozno, Pskov Governorate, Russian Empire (now Liozna, Belarus), in 1775, by Shneur Zalman, a student of Dov Ber of Mezeritch, the successor to Hasidism's founder, Rabbi Israel Baal Shem Tov. The movement was moved to Lyubavichi (Yiddish Lubavitch), today's Russia, by the second Rebbe of Chabad, Rabbi Dovber Shneuri, in 1813. The movement was centered in Lyubavichi for a century until the fifth Rebbe, Rabbi Shalom Dovber left the village in 1915 and moved to the city of Rostov-on-Don. During the interwar period, following Bolshevik persecution, the Chabad-Lubavitch movement, under the Sixth Rebbe, Rabbi Yosef Yitzchak, was centered in Riga and then in Warsaw. The outbreak of World War II led to the Sixth Rebbe to move to the United States. Since 1940, the movement's center has been in the Crown Heights neighborhood of Brooklyn.

While the movement spawned a number of offshoot groups throughout its history, the Chabad-Lubavitch branch is the only one still active, making it the movement's main surviving line. Historian Jonathan Sarna has characterized Chabad as having enjoyed the fastest rate of growth of any Jewish religious movement in the period 1946–2015.

In the early 1900s, Chabad-Lubavitch legally incorporated itself under Agudas Chasidei Chabad ("Association of Chabad Hasidim").

Early community histories of Chabad produced by members or former members of the Chabad community include Toldot Amudei HaChabad (Konigsberg, 1876) by Michael Levi Rodkinson and Beit Rebbe (Berdichev, 1902) by Hayim Meir Heilman.

Leadership 

The Chabad movement has been led by a succession of Hasidic rebbes. The main line of the movement, Chabad-Lubavitch, has had seven rebbes in total:
 Rabbi Shneur Zalman of Liadi (1745–1812), founded the Chabad movement in the town of Liozna. He later moved the movement's center to the town of Liadi. Rabbi Shneur Zalman was the youngest disciple of Dov Ber of Mezeritch, the principal disciple and successor of Rabbi Israel Baal Shem Tov, founder of Hasidism. The Chabad movement began as a separate school of thought within the Hasidic movement, focusing of the spread of Hasidic mystical teachings using logical reasoning (creating a kind of Jewish "rational-mysticism"). Shneur Zalman's main work is the Tanya (or Sefer Shel Beinonim, "Book of the Average Man"). The Tanya is the central book of Chabad thought and is studied daily by followers of the Chabad movement. Shneur Zalman's other works include a collection of writings on Hasidic thought, and the Shulchan Aruch HaRav, a revised version of the code of Halakha, both of which are studied regularly by followers of Chabad. Shneur Zalman's successors went by last names such as "Schneuri" and "Schneersohn" (later "Schneerson"), signifying their descent from the movement's founder. He is commonly referred to as the "Old Rebbe" ( Alter Rebbe or  Admur Hazoken).
 Rabbi Dovber Schneuri (1773–1827), son of Rabbi Shneur Zalman, led the Chabad movement in the town of Lyubavichi (Lubavitch). His leadership was initially disputed by Rabbi Aaron Halevi of Stroselye, however, Rabbi Dovber was generally recognized as his father's rightful successor, and the movement's leader. Rabbi Dovber published a number of his writings on Hasidic thought, greatly expanding his father's work. He also published some of his father's writings. Many of Rabbi Dovber's works have been subsequently republished by the Chabad movement. He is commonly referred to as the Mitteler Rebbe ( "Middle Rabbi",  Admur Ha'emtzoei).
 Rabbi Menachem Mendel Schneersohn (1789–1866), a grandson of Rabbi Shneur Zalman and son-in-law of Rabbi Dovber. Following his attempt to persuade the Chabad movement to accept his brother-in-law or uncle as rebbe, Rabbi Menachem Mendel assumed the title of rebbe of Chabad, also leading the movement from the town of Lyubavichi (Lubavitch). He published a number of his works on both Hasidic thought and Jewish law. Rabbi Menachem Mendel also published some of the works of his grandfather, Rabbi Shneur Zalman. He is commonly referred to as the Tzemach Tzedek after the title of his responsa.
 Rabbi Shmuel Schneersohn (1834–1882), was the seventh and youngest son of Rabbi Menachem Mendel. He assumed the title of rebbe in town of Lyubavichi (Lubavitch), while several of his brothers assumed the title of rebbe in other towns, forming Chabad groups of their own which existed for several decades. Years after his death, his teachings were published by the Chabad movement. He is commonly referred to as the Maharash, an acronym for Moreinu HaRav Shmuel ("our teacher, Rabbi Shmuel").
 Rabbi Shalom Dovber Schneersohn (1860–1920), Shmuel's second son, succeeded his father as rebbe. Rabbi Shalom Dovber waited some time before officially accepting the title of rebbe, as not to offend his elder brother, Zalman Aaron. He established a yeshiva called Tomchei Temimim. During World War I, he moved to Rostov-on-Don. Many of his writings were published after his death, and are studied regularly in Chabad yeshivas. He is commonly referred to as the Rashab, an acronym for Rabbi Shalom Ber.
 Rabbi Yosef Yitzchak Schneersohn (1880–1950), the only son of Sholom Dovber, succeeded his father as rebbe of Chabad. Rabbi Yosef Yitzchak was exiled from Russia, following an attempt by the Bolshevik government to have him executed. He led the movement from Warsaw, Poland, until the start of World War II. After fleeing the Nazis, Rabbi Yosef Yitzchak lived in Brooklyn, New York until his death. He established much of Chabad's current organizational structure, founding several of its central organizations as well as other Chabad institutions, both local and international. He published a number of his writings, as well as the works of his predecessors. He is commonly referred to as the Rayatz or the Frierdiker Rebbe ("Previous Rebbe").
 Rabbi Menachem Mendel Schneerson (1902–1994), son-in-law of Rabbi Yosef Yitzchak, and a great-grandson of the third Rebbe of Lubavitch, assumed the title of rebbe one year after his father-in-law's death. Rabbi Menachem Mendel greatly expanded Chabad's global network, establishing hundreds of new Chabad centers across the globe. He published many of his own works as well as the works of his predecessors. His teachings are studied regularly by followers of Chabad. He is commonly referred to as "the Lubavitcher Rebbe", or simply "the Rebbe". Even after his death, many continue to revere him as the leader of the Chabad movement.

Oppression and resurgence in Russia 
The Chabad movement was subject to government oppression in Russia. The Russian government, first under the Czar, later under the Bolsheviks, imprisoned all but one of the Chabad rebbes. The Bolsheviks also imprisoned, exiled and executed a number of Chabad Hasidim. During the Second World War, many Chabad Hasidim evacuated to the Uzbek cities of Samarkand and Tashkent where they established small centers of Hasidic life, while at the same time seeking ways to emigrate from Soviet Russia due to the government's suppression of religious life. The reach of Chabad in Central Asia also included earlier efforts that took place in the 1920s. Following the war, and well after the center of the Chabad movement moved to the United States, the movement remained active in Soviet Russia, aiding the local Jews known as Refuseniks who sought to learn more about Judaism. And throughout the Soviet era, the Chabad movement maintained a secret network across the USSR. Since the dissolution of the Soviet Union in 1991, state persecution of Chabad ceased. The Chief Rabbi of Russia, Berel Lazar, a Chabad emissary, maintains warm relations with Russian President Vladimir Putin. Lazar also received the Order of Friendship and Order "For Merit to the Fatherland" medals from him.

Relations with other Hasidic groups 
The relations between the seventh Chabad Rebbe and the leaders of other Orthodox groups were recorded by Chabad author Rabbi Shalom Dov Wolpo in his three volume anthology titled Shemen Sasson MeChaveirecha.

In the 1980s, tensions arose between Chabad and Satmar Chasidim as a result of several assaults on Chabad Hasidim by Satmar Hasidim.

Influence 
Chabad's influence among world Jewry has been far reaching since World War II. Chabad pioneered the post-World War II Jewish outreach movement, which spread Judaism to many assimilated Jews worldwide, leading to a substantial number of baalei teshuva ("returnees" to Judaism). The very first Yeshiva/Rabbinical College for such baalei teshuva, Hadar Hatorah, was established by the Lubavitcher rebbe. It is reported that up to a million Jews attend Chabad services at least once a year.

According to Steven I. Weiss, Chabad's ideology has dramatically influenced non-Hasidic Jews' outreach practice. Because of its outreach to all Jews, including those quite alienated from religious Jewish tradition, Chabad has been described as the one Orthodox group which evokes great affection from large segments of American Jewry.

Philosophy 

Chabad Hasidic philosophy focuses on religious and spiritual concepts such as God, the soul, and the meaning of the Jewish commandments. Classical Judaic writings and Jewish mysticism, especially the Zohar and the Kabbalah of Rabbi Isaac Luria, are frequently cited in Chabad works. These texts are used both as sources of Chabad teachings and as material requiring interpretation by Chabad authors. Many of these teachings discuss what is commonly referred to as bringing "heaven down to earth", i.e. making this world a dwelling place for God. Chabad philosophy is rooted in the teachings of Rabbis Yisroel ben Eliezer, (the Baal Shem Tov, founder of Hasidism) and Dovber ben Avraham, the "Maggid of Mezritch" (Rabbi Yisroel's successor).

Rabbi Shneur Zalman's teachings, particularly in the Tanya, formed the basis of Chabad philosophy, as expanded by succeeding generations. Many Chabad activities today are understood as applications of Shneur Zalman's teachings.

Tanya 

The  is a book by Rabbi Shneur Zalman first published in 1797. It is the first schematic treatment of Hasidic moral philosophy and its metaphysical foundations.

While other branches of Hasidism focused primarily on the idea that "God desires the heart," Shneur Zalman argued that God also desires the mind, and that the mind is the "gateway" to the heart. With the Chabad philosophy he elevated the mind above the heart, arguing that "understanding is the mother of fear and love for God".

The  has five sections. Citing the biblical verse "the matter is very near to you, in your mouth, your heart, to do", the philosophy is based on the notion that the human is not inherently evil; rather, every individual has an inner conflict that is characterized by two different inclinations, the good and the bad.

Chabad often contrasted itself with what is termed the Chagat schools of Hasidism. While all schools of Hasidism put a central focus on the emotions, Chagat saw emotions as a reaction to physical stimuli, such as dancing, singing, or beauty. Shneur Zalman, on the other hand, taught that the emotions must be led by the mind, and thus the focus of Chabad thought was to be Torah study and prayer rather than esotericism and song. As a Talmudist, Shneur Zalman endeavored to place Kabbalah and Hasidism on a rational basis.

Community 

Chabad's adherents include both Hasidic followers, as well as non-Hasidim, who have joined Chabad synagogues and other Chabad-run institutions.

The Chabad community consists of the followers (Hasidim) of the Chabad rebbes. Originally based in Eastern Europe, today, various Chabad communities span the globe; communities with high concentrations of Chabad's Hasidic followers include Crown Heights, Brooklyn, and Kfar Chabad, Israel.

According to sociologists studying contemporary Jewry, the Chabad movement fits into neither the standard category of Haredi nor that of modern Orthodox among Orthodox Jews. This is due in part to the existence of the number of Chabad supporters and affiliates who are not Orthodox (dubbed by some scholars as "non-Orthodox Hasidim"), the general lack of official recognition of political and religious distinctions within Judaism and the open relationship with non-Orthodox Jews represented by the activism of Chabad emissaries.

Demographics 
In 2018, the first global demographic estimate of Hasidim was conducted based on community directories for Hasidic communities. The estimate for Chabad's demographic size is approximately 13% of Hasidim globally, accounting for 16,000–17,000 households or 90,000–95,000 individuals. Prior to this study, the demographic accounts on the Chabad movement varied greatly. Compared to other Hasidic groups, Chabad was thought to be either the largest, or the third or fourth largest Hasidic movement. Chabad adherents were often reported to number some 200,000 persons. Some scholars pointed to the lack of quantitative data to back this claim, while some placed the number of Chabad followers at around 40,000 but note that the number may be higher if the non-Hasidic Jews who join Chabad synagogues are included as well. In 2018, Marcin Wodziński produced his Historical Atlas of Hasidism which used Chabad community directories to establish that Chabad included over 16,000 Hasidic households, translating to over 90,000 individuals, making the group the second largest Hasidic community after the Satmar community.

United States 

Estimates for Chabad and other Hasidic groups are often based on extrapolation from the limited information available in US census data for some of the areas where Hasidim live. A 2006 estimate was drawn from a study on the Montreal Chabad community (determining average household size), in conjunction with language and other select indicators from US census data, it is estimated that Chabad in the United States includes approximately 4,000 households, which contains between 22,000 and 25,000 people. In terms of Chabad's relation to other Hasidic groups, within the New York metropolitan area, Chabad in the New York area accounts for around 15% of the total New York Hasidic population. Chabad is estimated to have an annual growth of 3.6%.

 Crown Heights – The Crown Heights Chabad community's estimated size is 10,000 to 12,000 or 12,000 to 16,000. In 2006, extrapolating based on census data, it was estimated that the Chabad community in Crown Heights make up some 11,000. It was estimated that between 25% to 35% of Chabad Hasidim in Crown Heights speak Yiddish. This figure is significantly lower than other Hasidic groups and may be attributed to the addition of previously non-Hasidic Jews to the community. It was also estimated that over 20% of Chabad Hasidim in Crown Heights speak Hebrew or Russian. The Crown Heights Chabad community has its own Beis Din (rabbinical court) and Crown Heights Jewish Community Council (CHJCC).

 Chabad hipsters – Beginning from the late 2000s through the 2010s, a minor trend of cross acculturation of Chabad Hasidim and contemporary hipster subculture appeared within the New York City Jewish community. According to The Jewish Daily Forward, a significant number of members of the Chabad Hasidic community, mostly residing in Crown Heights, Brooklyn, appear to now have adopted various cultural affinities of the local hipster subculture. These members are referred to as Chabad hipsters or Hipster Hasidim.

Schools in the United States 
The report findings of studies on Jewish day schools and supplementary Jewish education in the United States show that the student body currently enrolled in some 295 Chabad schools exceeds 20,750, although this figure includes Chabad Hasidic children as well as non-Chabad children.

Israel 
 Kfar Chabad – Kfar Chabad's estimated size is 5,100; the residents of the town are believed to all be Chabad adherents. This estimate is based on figures published by the Israeli Census Bureau. Other estimates place the community population at around 7,000.
 Safed – The Chabad community in Safad (Tzfat) originates from the wave of Eastern European immigration to Palestine of 1777–1840. The Chabad community established synagogues and institutions in Safad. The early settlement declined by the 20th century but was renewed following an initiative by the seventh rebbe in the early 1970s, which reestablished the Chabad community in the city. Activities include blowing the shofar for the elderly on Rosh Hashana, reading the Megilla for hospital patients on Purim and setting up a Sukka on the town's main street during the Succoth holiday.

France 
The Chabad community in France is estimated to be between 10,000 and 15,000. The majority of the Chabad community in France are the descendants of immigrants from North Africa (specifically Algeria, Morocco and Tunisia) during the 1960s.

Canada 
 Montreal – The estimated size of the Chabad community of Greater Montreal is 1,590. The estimate is taken from a 2003 community study. The Chabad community in Montreal originated sometime before 1931. While early works on Canadian Jewry make little or no mention of early Hasidic life in Canada, later researchers have documented Chabad's accounts in Canada starting from the 1900s and 1910s. Steven Lapidus notes that there is mention of two Chabad congregations in a 1915 article in the Canadian Jewish Chronicle listing the delegates of the first Canadian Jewish Conference. One congregation is listed as Chabad of Toronto, and the other is simply listed as "Libavitzer Congregation". The sociologist William Shaffir has noted that some Chabad Hasidim and sympathizers did reside in Montreal before 1941 but does not elaborate further. Steven Lapidus notes that in a 1931 obituary published in Keneder Odler, a Canadian Yiddish newspaper, the deceased Rabbi Menashe Lavut is credited as the founder of Anshei Chabad in Montreal and the Nusach Ari synagogue. Thus the Chabad presence in Montreal predates 1931.

United Arab Emirates 
 Dubai – The Jewish Community Center of UAE has a synagogue and a Talmud Torah. 1,000 kosher chickens per week are provided to the community by local kosher shechita. The community is headed by community president Solly Wolf and Rabbi Levi Duchman.

Ashkenazim and Sephardim 
Although the Chabad movement was founded in Eastern Europe, a center of Ashkenazic Jewry, it has attracted a significant number of Sephardi Jews as adherents in the past several decades. Some Chabad communities are now a mix of Ashkenazi and Sephardi Chabad Hasidim. In Montreal, close to 25% of Chabad households include a Sephardi parent.

Customs and holidays

Customs 
Chabad adherents follow Chabad traditions and prayer services based on Lurianic Kabbalah. General Chabad customs, called  (or ), distinguish the movement from other Hasidic groups. Some of the main Chabad customs are minor practices performed on traditional Jewish holidays:

 Passover – It is customary in Chabad communities, on Passover, to limit contact of matzah (an unleavened bread eaten on Passover) with water. This custom is called  (lit. 'broken'). However, on the last day of Passover, it is customary to intentionally have matzah come in contact with water.
 Chanukah – It is the custom of Chabad Hasidim to place the Chanukah menorah against the room's doorpost (and not on the windowsill).
 Prayer – The founder of Chabad wrote a very specific liturgy for the daily and festival prayers based on the teachings of the Kabbalists, primarily the Arizal.
 The founder of Chabad also instituted various other halachic rulings, including the use of stainless steel knives for the slaughter of animals before human consumption, which are now universally accepted in all sects of Judaism.

Holidays 
There are a number of days marked by the Chabad movement as special days. Major holidays include the liberation dates of the leaders of the movement, the rebbes of Chabad, others corresponded to the leaders' birthdays, anniversaries of death, and other life events.

The days marking the leaders' release, are celebrated by the Chabad movement as "Days of Liberation" (Hebrew: ). The most noted day is —the liberation of Rabbi Shneur Zalman of Liadi, the founder of the Chabad movement. The day is also called the "New Year of Hasidism".

Organizations 

Chabad's central organization representing the movement at large, Agudas Chasidei Chabad, is headed by Rabbi Abraham Shemtov. The educational, outreach and social services arms, Merkos L'Inyonei Chinuch and Machneh Israel are headed by Rabbi Yehuda Krinsky, as well as the Chabad-Lubavitch publishing house, Kehot Publication Society.

Local Chabad centers and institutions are usually incorporated as separate legal entities.

Institutions 
As of 2020 there were over 3,500 Chabad centers in 100 countries. The Chabad movement's online directory lists around 1,350 Chabad institutions. This number includes schools and other Chabad-affiliated establishments. The number of Chabad centers vary per country; the majority are in the United States and Israel. There are over 100 countries with a small Chabad presence.

In total, according to its directory, Chabad maintains a presence in 950 cities around the world: 178 in Europe, 14 in Africa, 200 in Israel, 400 in North America, 38 in South America, and about 70 in Asia (excluding Israel, including Russia).

By geographic region 

Chabad presence varies from region to region. The continent with the highest concentration of Chabad centers is North America. The continent with the fewest centers is Africa.

Chabad house 

A Chabad house is a form of Jewish community center, primarily serving both educational and observance purposes. Often, until the community can support its own center, the Chabad house is located in the 's home, with the living room being used as the "synagogue". Effort is made to provide an atmosphere in which the nonobservant will not feel intimidated by any perceived contrast between their lack of knowledge of Jewish practice and the advanced knowledge of some of the people they meet there. The term "Chabad House" originated with the creation of the first such outreach center on the campus of UCLA by Rabbi Shlomo Cunin. A key to the Chabad house was given to the Rebbe and he asked if that meant that the new house was his home. He was told yes and he replied, "My hand will be on the door of this house to keep it open twenty-four hours a day for young and old, men and women alike."

Followers of Chabad can be seen attending to tefillin booths at the Western Wall and Ben Gurion International Airport as well as other public places, and distributing Shabbat candles on Fridays. Chabad rabbis and their families are sent to various major cities around the globe, to teach college students, build day schools, and create youth camps. Many of these efforts are geared towards secular or less religious Jews.  Additionally, unmarried rabbinical students spend weeks during the summer in locations that do not yet have a permanent Chabad presence, making housecalls, putting up mezuzot and teaching about Judaism. This is known as Merkos Shlichus.

Rabbi Menachem Mendel Schneerson also initiated a Jewish children's movement, called Tzivos Hashem (lit. "Army [of] God"), for under bar/bat mitzvah-age children, to inspire them to increase in study of Torah and observance of mitzvot.

Rabbi Schneerson also encouraged the use of modern technology in outreach efforts such as Mitzva tanks, which are mobile homes that travel a city or country. The Chabad website, chabad.org, a pioneer of Jewish religious outreach on the Internet, was started by Rabbi Yosef Y. Kazen and developed by Rabbi D. Zirkind.

In June 1994, Rabbi Schneerson died with no successor. Since then, over two thousand couples have taken up communal leadership roles in outreach, bringing the estimated total number of "Shluchim" to over five thousand worldwide.

In the 2008 Mumbai attacks, the local Chabad house was targeted. The local Chabad emissaries, Rabbi Gavriel Holtzberg and his wife Rivka, and four other Jews were tortured and murdered by Islamic terrorists. Chabad received condolences from around the world.

Fundraising 
Funds for activities of a Chabad center rely entirely on the local community. Chabad centers do not receive funding from Lubavitch headquarters. For the day-to-day operations, local emissaries do all the fundraising by themselves.

Chabad emissaries often solicit the support of local Jews.

Activities 
The Chabad movement has been involved in numerous activities in contemporary Jewish life. These activities include providing Jewish education to different age groups, outreach to non-affiliated Jews, publishing Jewish literature, and summer camps for children, among other activities.

Education 
Chabad runs a number of educational institutions. Most are Jewish day schools; others offer secondary and adult education.

 Day schools – In the United States, there are close to 300 day schools and supplementary schools run by Chabad.
 Secondary schools – Chabad runs multiple secondary education institutions, most notable are Tomchei Tmimim for young men, and Bais Rivka for young women.
 Adult education – Chabad runs adult education programs including those organized by the Rohr Jewish Learning Institute and the Jewish Learning Network.

Outreach activities 

Many of the movement's activities emphasize outreach activities. This is due to Rabbi Menachem Mendel Schneerson encouraging his followers to reach out to other Jews. Chabad outreach includes activities promoting the practice of Jewish commandments (Mitzvah campaigns), as well as other forms of Jewish outreach. Much of Chabad's outreach is performed by Chabad emissaries (see Shaliach (Chabad)). Most of the communities that Chabad emissaries reach out to are other Jewish communities, such as Reform Jews.

Rabbi Yosef Yitzchok Schneersohn, 6th leader of the Chabad-Lubavitch branch of Hasidic Judaism, and then his successor, Rabbi Menachem Mendel Schneerson were responsible for focusing Chabad's activities on outreach. Rabbi Schneerson was a pioneer in the field of Orthodox Judaism outreach (Kiruv).

Each sent out large numbers of rabbinic emissaries, known as "Shluchim", to settle in places across the world for outreach purposes. The centers that these Shluchim established were termed "Chabad houses."

Chabad has been active in reaching out to Jews through its synagogues, and various forms of more direct outreach efforts. The organization has been recognized as one of the leaders in using free holiday services to reach out across denominations.

Rabbi Yosef Yitzchok Schneersohn, had a core of dedicated Hasidim who maintained underground yeshivos and mikvehs, and provided shechitah and ritual circumcision services in the Soviet Union.

Mitzvah campaigns 

The Rebbes of Chabad have issued the call to all Jews to attract non-observant Jews to adopt Orthodox Jewish observance, teaching that this activity is part of the process of bringing the Messiah. Rabbi Menachem Mendel Schneerson issued a call to every Jew: "Even if you are not fully committed to a Torah life, do something. Begin with a mitzvah — any mitzvah – its value will not be diminished by the fact that there are others that you are not prepared to do".

Schneerson also suggested ten specific  that he believed were ideally suited for the emissaries to introduce to non-observant Jews. These were called  — meaning "campaigns" or "endeavors".

He argued that redemption was predicated on Jews doing good deeds, and that gentiles should be educated about the Noahide Laws.

Schneerson was emphatic about the need to encourage and provide strong education for every child, Jew and non-Jew alike. In honor of Schneerson's efforts in education the United States Congress has made Education and Sharing Day on the Rebbe's Hebrew birthday (11 Nissan).

(Emissaries) 

As a result, Chabad  ("emissaries", sing. ) have moved all over the world with the stated mission of encouraging non-observant Jews to adopt Orthodox Jewish observance. They assist Jews with all their religious needs, as well as with physical assistance and spiritual guidance and teaching. The stated goal is to encourage Jews to learn more about their Jewish heritage and to practice Judaism.

The Chabad movement, motivated by Schneerson, has trained and ordained thousands of rabbis, educators, ritual slaughterers, and ritual circumcisers, who are then accompanied by their spouses to many locations around the world. Typically, a young Lubavitch rabbi and his wife, in their early twenties, with one or two children, will move to a new location, and as they settle in will raise a large family who, as a family unit, will aim to fulfill their mandate of bringing Jewish people closer to Orthodox Judaism and encouraging gentiles to adhere to the Seven Laws of Noah. To date, there are around 5000  in 100 countries.

Mitzvah tank 

A mitzvah tank is a vehicle used by Chabad members involved in outreach as a portable "educational and outreach center" and "mini-synagogue" (or "minagogue"). Mitzvah tanks are commonly used for advancing the mitzvah campaigns. Mitzvah tanks have been commonplace on the streets of New York City since 1974. Today, they are used all over the globe in countries where Chabad is active.

Campus outreach 

In recent years, Chabad has greatly expanded its outreach on university and college campuses. Chabad Student Centers are active on over 100 campuses, and Chabad offers varied activities at an additional 150 universities worldwide. Professor Alan Dershowitz has said "Chabad's presence on college campuses today is absolutely crucial," and "we cannot rest until Chabad is on every major college campus in the world."

CTeen 
CTeen is an international organization dedicated to educating Jewish youth about their heritage. It is the teen-focused arm of the Chabad movement operated by Merkos L'Inyonei Chinuch. There are over 100,000 members worldwide with 630 chapters across 44 countries. CTeen is open to all Jewish teens, regardless of affiliation, and has been called “the fastest growing and most diverse Jewish youth organization in the world.”

The organization was launched in 2010, and operates worldwide in cities such as Paris, Rio de Janeiro, Leeds, Munich, Buenos Aires and New York. Its director is Rabbi Shimon Rivkin, and Rabbi Moshe Kotlarsky serves as chairman. Individual chapters and programs are managed by local directors.

CTeen runs a number of ongoing and annual programs, some of which include:
 CTeen International Shabbaton, an annual inspirational weekend that brings together thousands of teens from around the world. The program includes a traditional Shabbat experience in the heart of Hasidic Crown Heights, a Torah completion ceremony in Times Square, and the CTeen Choice Awards at Brooklyn's Pier 12. The weekend includes a Saturday night concert in Times Square with guest performances by singers such as Gad Elbaz, Yakov Shwekey and American Hasidic rapper Nissim Black.
 CTeen XTREME, a summer travel camp where campers challenge themselves both physically and spiritually by partaking in extreme sports, observing a completely tech-free Shabbat, and keeping kosher on the road.
 CTeen U, a college-accredited program where teens learn about Jewish philosophy, ethics and history. The program was launched in 2019 through a partnership with Yeshiva University.
 Heritage Quest, educational travel programs that aim to deepen the connection of Jewish teens to their heritage through trips to Poland and Israel, offering teens the chance to explore their roots at the source.
Kosher Food Club, a co-curricular high school club operating in over fifty high schools throughout the United States that serves as a humanitarian initiative to promote healthy lifestyles, feed the homeless, and provide educational and hands-on experiences making traditional Jewish foods.
 National Campus Office — coordinator of Chabad on Campus, a network of Jewish Student Centers on more than 230 university campuses worldwide (as of April 2016), as well as regional Chabad-Lubavitch centers at an additional 150 universities worldwide
 Suicide Alert, workshops that equip teens to assist peers dealing with anxiety and depression resulting from the COVID-19 pandemic. The workshops have been organized by CTeen chapters in Florida, New Hampshire and New Jersey, among others, in partnership with the Gelt Charitable Foundation.

Chabad Young Professionals 

Targeting the demographic of young professionals, Chabad's new initiative focuses on social events and business networking to fuel Jewish activity in young professional's lives. With seminars on career advancement, social gatherings for Jewish holidays, and the ability to connect with other like-minded Jews in the area, Chabad Young Professionals (CYP) combines networking and meaning into many young people's lives.

Publishing 

Chabad publishes and distributes Jewish religious literature. Under Kehot Publication Society, Chabad's main publishing house, Jewish literature has been translated into 12 different languages. Kehot regularly provides books at discounted prices, and hosts book-a-thons. Kehot commonly distributes books written or transcribed from the rebbes of Chabad, prominent chassidim and other authors who have written Jewish materials.

Kehot is a division of Merkos L'Inyonei Chinuch, the movement's educational arm.

Media 
More than any other Jewish movement, Chabad has used media as part of its religious, social, and political experience. Their latest leader, Menachem Mendel Schneerson, was the most video-documented Jewish leader in history.

Chabad.org 

The Chabad movement publishes a wealth of Jewish material on the internet. Chabad's main website Chabad.org, is one of the first Jewish websites and the first and largest virtual congregation. It serves not just its own members but Jewish people worldwide in general.

Community websites 

Popular Chabad community websites include Chabad.org, asktherav.com, anash.org, CrownHeights.info, Shmais.com, Chdailynews.com, and the Hebrew site, COL.org.il.

Summer camps 

Chabad has set up an extensive network of camps around the world, most using the name Gan Israel, a name chosen by Schneerson although the first overnight camp was the girls division called Camp Emunah. There are 1,200 sites serving 210,000 children – most of whom do not come from Orthodox homes. Of these, 500 camps are in the United States.

Political activities 
Rabbi Schneerson involved himself in matters relating to the resolution of the Israeli-Arab conflict. He maintained that as a matter of Jewish law, any territorial concession on Israel's part would endanger the lives of all Jews in the Land of Israel, and is therefore forbidden. He also insisted that even discussing the possibility of such concessions showed weakness, would encourage Arab attacks, and therefore endanger Jewish lives.

In US domestic politics, Schneerson supported government involvement in education and welcomed the establishment of the United States Department of Education in 1980, yet insisted that part of a school's educational mission was to incorporate the values espoused in the Seven Laws of Noah. He called for the introduction of a moment of silence at the beginning of the school day, and for students to be encouraged to use this time for such improving thoughts or prayers as their parents might suggest.

In 1981, Schneerson publicly called for the use of solar energy. Schneerson believed that the US could achieve energy independence by developing solar energy technologies. He argued that the dependence on foreign oil may lead to the country compromising on its principles.

Library dispute with Russia 
In 2013, US federal judge Royce Lamberth ruled in favor of Chabad lawyers who sought contempt sanctions on three Russian organizations to return the Schneersohn Library – 12,000 books belonging to Rabbi Yosef Schneersohn seized and nationalized by the Bolsheviks in 1917–18, to the Brooklyn Chabad Library. Chabad Rabbi Berel Lazar, Russia's Chief Rabbi, reluctantly accepted Putin's request in moving the Schneerson Library to Moscow's Jewish Museum and Tolerance Center as a form of compromise, which was criticized by the Chabad Library.

Controversies 

Several movement-wide controversies have occurred in Chabad's 200-year history. Two major leadership succession controversies occurred in the 19th century; one took place in the 1810s following the death of the movement's founder, the other occurred in the 1860s following the death of the third Rebbe. Two other minor offshoot groups were formed later in the movement's history. The movement's other major controversy is Chabad messianism, which began in the 1990s.

Succession disputes and offshoot groups 

A number of groups have split from the Chabad movement, forming their own Hasidic groups, and at times positioning themselves as possible successors of previous Chabad rebbes. Following the deaths of the first and third rebbes of Chabad, disputes arose over their succession.

Following the death of Rabbi Shneur Zalman of Liadi, the first Chabad rebbe, a dispute over his succession led to a break within the movement. While the recognized successor was his oldest son, Rabbi Dovber Schneuri, a student of Rabbi Schneur Zalman, Rabbi Aaron HaLevi assumed the title of rebbe, and led a number of followers from the town of Strashelye (forming the Strashelye dynasty). The new group had two rebbes, Rabbi Aaron and his son Rabbi Haim Rephael. The new group eventually disbanded following Rabbi Haim Rephael's death. One of the main points the two rabbis disagreed on was the place of spiritual ecstasy in prayer. R' Aaron supported the idea while Rabbi Dovber emphasized genuine ecstasy can only be a result of meditative contemplation (hisbonenus). Rabbi Dovber published his arguments on the subject in a compilation titled  ("Tract on Ecstasy").

Following the death of the third Chabad rebbe, Rabbi Menachem Mendel Schneersohn (the ), a dispute over his succession led to the formation of several Chabad groups. While Rabbi Shmuel Schneersohn was recognized as the heir to the Chabad-Lubavitch line, several of his brothers formed groups of their own in the towns of Kopys (forming the Kapust dynasty), Nezhin (forming the Niezhin dynasty), Lyady (forming the Liadi dynasty), and Ovruch (forming the Avrutch dynasty). The lifespan of these groups varied; Niezhin and Avrutch had one rebbe each, Liadi had three rebbes, and Kapust had four. Following the deaths of their last rebbes, these groups eventually disbanded.

Two other minor offshoot groups were formed by Chabad Hasidim. The Malachim were formed as a quasi-Hasidic group. The group claims to recognize the teachings of the first four rebbes of Chabad, thus rivaling the later Chabad rebbes. The Malachim's first and only rebbe, Rabbi Chaim Avraham Dov Ber Levine haCohen (1859/1860–1938), also known as "The Malach" (lit. "the angel"), was a follower of the fourth and fifth rebbes of Chabad. While Levine's son chose not to succeed him, the Malachim group continues to maintain a yeshiva and minyan in Williamsburg, Brooklyn.

Following the death of the seventh Chabad Rebbe, Rabbi Menachem Mendel Schneerson, an attempt by Shaul Shimon Deutsch to form a breakaway Chabad movement, with Deutsch as "Liozna Rebbe", failed to gain popular support.

Chabad messianism 

A few years prior to Schneerson's death, some members of the Chabad movement expressed their belief that Menachem Mendel Schneerson is the Jewish messiah. Those subscribing to the beliefs have been termed meshichists (messianists). A typical statement of belief for Chabad messianists is the song and chant known as yechi adoneinu ("long live our master"). Customs vary among messianists as to when the phrase is recited.

Chabad messianists either believe Schneerson will be resurrected from the dead to be revealed as the messiah, or go further and profess the belief that Schneerson never died in 1994 and is waiting to be revealed as messiah. The Chabad messianic phenomenon has been met mostly with public concerns or opposition from Chabad and non-Chabad Jewish leaders alike.

In the arts

Art 
Chabad Hasidic artists Hendel Lieberman and Zalman Kleinman have painted a number of scenes depicting Chabad Hasidic culture, including religious ceremonies, study and prayer. Chabad artist Michoel Muchnik has painted scenes of the Mitzvah Campaigns.

Artist and  Yitzchok Moully has adapted silkscreen techniques, bright colours and Jewish and Hasidic images to create a form of "Chasidic Pop Art".

Music 
Vocalists Avraham Fried and Benny Friedman have included recordings of traditional Chabad songs on their albums of contemporary Orthodox Jewish music. Bluegrass artist Andy Statman has also recorded Chabad spiritual melodies.

Reggae artist Matisyahu has included portions of Chabad  and lyrics with Chabad philosophical themes in some of his songs.

Literature 
In the late 1930s, Dr Fishl Schneersohn, a psychiatrist, pedagogical theorist, and descendant of the founder of Chabad authored a Yiddish novel titled Chaim Gravitzer: The Tale of the Downfallen One from the World of Chabad. The novel explores the spiritual struggle of a Chabad Hasid who doubts his faith and finally finds peace in doing charitable work.

Novelist Chaim Potok authored a work My Name is Asher Lev in which a Hasidic teen struggles between his artistic passions and the norms of the community. The "Ladover" community is a thinly veiled reference to the Lubavitcher community in Crown Heights.

Chabad poet Zvi Yair has written poems on Chabad philosophical topics including  (spiritual yearning).

The American Jewish writer and publisher, Clifford Meth, wrote a short science fiction story depicting the future followers of the "70th Rebbe" of Chabad and their outreach efforts on an alien planet called Tau Ceti IV. The story is told through the eyes of a young extraterrestrial yeshiva student.

The American Jewish writer and publisher, Richard Horowitz, wrote a memoir, The Boys Yeshiva, describing his time teaching at a Chabad yeshiva in Los Angeles.

Film and television 

The Chabad-Lubavitch community has been the subject of a number of documentary films. These films include:
 The Spark – a 28-minute film, produced in 1974, providing an overview of the Lubavitch and Satmar of New York. The film was directed by Mel Epstein.
 The Return: A Hasidic Experience – a 1979 documentary film on Jews who joined the Chabad movement, directed by Yisrael Lifshutz and Barry Ralbag.
 What Is a Jew? – a 1989 documentary on Chabad produced by the BBC for the series Everyman.
 King of Crown Heights – a 60-minute, 1993 film on Lubavitcher Hasidim by Columbia University student Roggerio Gabbai
 Fires in the Mirror: Crown Heights, Brooklyn and Other Identities – a 1993 TV adaptation of the one-person play by Anna Deavere Smith. It explores the Black and Hasidic viewpoints of people connected directly and indirectly to the Crown Heights riots. The adaptation was produced by PBS as part of its American Playhouse series.
 The Return of Sarah's Daughters – a 1997 documentary film contrasting three Jewish women, one of whom joins Chabad.
 Blacks and Jews – A 1997 documentary written and directed by Deborah Kaufman and Alan Snitow on the Crown Heights riot and other incidents involving intergroup conflict.
 Welcome to the Waks Family – a 2003 documentary of a Chabad family in Australia.
 Leaving the Fold – a 2008 documentary on young men and women who left the Hasidic Jewish community. The film was directed by Eric R. Scott and the stories featured include former Hasidic Jews living in the United States, Israel and Canada. Featured in the film are two young men from a Chabad family in Montreal as well as a French Lubavitch rabbi.
 Gut Shabbes Vietnam – a 2008 documentary on a Chabad family in Vietnam. Written and directed by Ido and Yael Zand.
 Shekinah Rising – a 70 min, 2013 documentary exploring the perspectives of the female students of a Chabad school in Montreal
 Kathmandu – a 2012 television series aired on Israeli television based on the lives of the Chabad emissaries in Kathmandu, Thailand.
 Project 2x1 – a 30 min, 2013 documentary on the Chabad Hasidim and West Indian residents of Crown Heights, using Google Glass in place of conventional camera techniques
 The Rabbi Goes West – a 2019 documentary on a Chabad rabbi who moves to Montana.

Other television 
 Religious America: Lubavitch – a 28-minute, 1974 PBS documentary series episode focusing on a day in the life of a Lubavitcher man
 Outback Rabbis – (2018) 50 min television segment by Australian TV network, SBS, covering the regional and rural Australia (RARA) program of Chabad. Directed by Danny Ben-Moshe. Featured on the SBS "Untold Australia" series.

See also 

 Satmar (Hasidic dynasty)
 Ger (Hasidic dynasty)
 Bobov (Hasidic dynasty)

References

Further reading 
 aSchneerson, Menachem Mendel. On the Essence of Chasidus: A Chasidic Discourse by Rabbi Menachem Mendel Schneerson of Chabad-Lubavitch. Merkos L'Inyonei Chinuch, 2003
 Drake, Carolyn. "A Faith Grows in Brooklyn". National Geographic (February 2006).
 Ehrlich, Avrum M. Leadership in the Habad Movement: A Critical Evaluation of Habad Leadership, History, and Succession, Jason Aronson, 2000.
 Feldman, Jan L. Lubavitchers as Citizens: A Paradox of Liberal Democracy, Cornell University Press, 2003
 Fishkoff, Sue. The Rebbe's Army: Inside the World of Chabad-Lubavitch, Schocken, 2003
 Heilman, Samuel and Menachem Friedman. The Rebbe: The Life and Afterlife of Menachem Mendel Schneerson (Princeton University Press; 2010) 400 pages
 Hoffman, Edward. Despite All Odds: The Story of Lubavitch. Simon & Schuster, 1991
 Jacobson, Simon. Toward a Meaningful Life: The Wisdom of the Rebbe, William Morrow, 2002
 Katz, Maya Balakirsky, "Trademarks of Faith: Chabad and Chanukah in America", Modern Judaism, 29,2 (2009), 239–267.
 Challenge: An Encounter with Lubavitch-Chabad, Lubavitch Foundation of Great Britain, 1973. .
 Miller, Chaim. Turning Judaism Outward: A Biography of Rabbi Menachem Mendel Schneerson the Seventh Lubavitcher Rebbe. Kol Menachem, 2014.
 Mindel, Nissan. The Philosophy of Chabad. Chabad Research Center, 1973
 Oberlander, Boruch and Elkanah Shmotkin. Early Years: The Formative Years of the Rebbe, Rabbi Menachem M. Schneerson, as Told by Documents and Archival Data, Kehot Publication Society. 2016..
 Steinzaltz, Adin Even Israel. My Rebbe. Koren Publishers, 2014.
 Tannenbaum, Michal and Hagit Cohen. 2018. "Language Educational Policy in the Service of Group Identity: The Habad case". Language Policy Volume 17, Issue 3, pp 319–342.
 Telushkin, Joseph. Rebbe: The Life and Teachings of Menachem M. Shneerson, the Most Influential Rabbi in Modern History. Harperwave, 2014.
 Weiss, Steven I. (January 20, 2006). "Orthodox Rethinking Campus Outreach" . The Jewish Daily Forward.

External links 

 Chabad Lubavitch World Headquarters
 Chabad.org
 Chabad Outreach
 Lubavitch Archives—Chabad history on the web
 The Previous Rebbe Accepts US Citizenship ("JEM - The Lubavitcher Rebbe" Official Channel, YouTube)
 The Chabad Lubavitch Library
 Chabad on Campus

Merkos L'Inyonei Chinuch
 

 
International Jewish organizations
Jewish organizations based in New York City
Jewish religious movements
Jewish Russian and Soviet history
Kabbalah
Organizations established in 1775
Chabad organizations